Bazkabad may refer to:
 Bazkabad, Khuzestan